The 1980 British motorcycle Grand Prix was the eighth round of the 1980 Grand Prix motorcycle racing season. It took place on the weekend of 8–10 August 1980 at the Silverstone Circuit.

Classification

500 cc

References

British motorcycle Grand Prix
British
Motorcycle Grand Prix
British Motorcycle Grand Prix